Air Commodore Charles Henry Elliott-Smith AFC (1889–1994) was a senior officer in the Royal Air Force who served in World War I and World War II.  He was awarded the Air Force Cross in 1919, and was made a Commander of the Order of George I, by the King of Greece, in 1944.

Life
Charles Henry Elliott-Smith was born on 6 October 1889 and educated at Bedford Modern School.

Elliott-Smith joined the British Army as a Second Lieutenant in the Bedfordshire Regiment in 1915. He enrolled early in the Royal Flying Corps, where he was made Captain in 1916, Major in 1918, and was awarded the Air Force Cross in 1919. Elliott-Smith was made Group Captain in 1935 and later Air Commodore.  

Elliott-Smith was made a Commander of the Order of George I by the King of Greece in 1944.  He died on 14 January 1994 as one of the oldest surviving former members of the Royal Air Force.

References

1889 births
1994 deaths
Recipients of the Air Force Cross (United Kingdom)
People educated at Bedford Modern School
Royal Air Force air commodores
British Army personnel of World War I
Bedfordshire and Hertfordshire Regiment officers
Men centenarians
British centenarians
Royal Flying Corps officers
Royal Air Force personnel of World War I
Royal Air Force personnel of World War II